Ethel Minor (November 26, 1922 - June 25, 2012) was a political figure and civil rights activist.

Minor was reared in Columbus, Texas and returned to San Antonio in 1944 to work at Kelly Air Force Base. During her time as a civilian working on the base, she was a fighter for equal treatment of employees.

Along with local civil rights leaders such as the Rev. Claude Black, Harry Burns, G J Sutton, Charles Hudspeth and others, Ms. Minor participated in marches and protests throughout Bexar County. She also served as church secretary of Antioch Missionary Baptist Church.

From 1986 to 1996, Ms. Minor was the president of the San Antonio Branch of the NAACP. During her time as president, she would organize the San Antonio Annual Martin Luther King Jr. Day March Celebration. The march has grown to become the largest annual civil rights celebration in the country with over 100,000 participants. After retiring from her post as president in 1997, Minor was approached by her community and asked to re-assume the post. She was again reelected in 2003.

References

External links
Ethel Minor on purpose of NAACP - Audio
NAACP leader still fiery at 81
Texas NAACP
Statement regarding term "Whiggas"
Interview with Ethel Minor, June 27, 1994, University of Texas at San Antonio: Institute of Texan Cultures: Oral History Collections, UA 15.01, University of Texas at San Antonio Libraries Special Collections.

Activists for African-American civil rights
1922 births
2012 deaths
People from San Antonio
African-American activists
Activists from Texas
People from Columbus, Texas
20th-century African-American women
21st-century American women
Women civil rights activists
21st-century African-American women